Stranger Things is an American science fiction horror television series created for Netflix by the Duffer Brothers, set in the fictional town of Hawkins, Indiana, in the 1980s. The first season, set in November 1983, focuses on the investigation into the disappearance of a young boy named Will Byers amid supernatural events occurring around the town, including the appearance of a girl with telekinetic abilities who helps Will's friends in their search. The second season (Stranger Things 2) is set a year after the last, and deals with the characters' attempts to return to normal and deal with the consequences of the first season's events. The second season adds new characters Max Mayfield, her violent stepbrother Billy Hargrove, and Joyce's new love interest Bob Newby. The third season (Stranger Things 3) is set in the summer of 1985 and shows the young friends maturing into teenagers and navigating new life challenges, all while a new threat looms over the town, this season also introduces a new character : Robin Buckley. The fourth season (Stranger Things 4) is set in the spring of 1986 and follows the characters after they have been separated at the end of Stranger Things 3. Season 4 adds new characters like Eddie Munson, Argyle, and Vecna. The first season was released on Netflix on July 15, 2016; the second season of nine episodes was released on October 27, 2017; and the third season of eight episodes was released on July 4, 2019. the fourth season was split into two volumes, with volume one with seven episodes released on May 27, 2022, and volume two with two episodes released on July 1, 2022.

The series features an ensemble cast including Winona Ryder, David Harbour, Finn Wolfhard, Millie Bobby Brown, Gaten Matarazzo, Caleb McLaughlin, Natalia Dyer, Charlie Heaton, Cara Buono and Matthew Modine. Noah Schnapp and Joe Keery had recurring roles in the first season before being promoted to the main cast for the second, with Sadie Sink, Dacre Montgomery, Sean Astin, and Paul Reiser also joining. Maya Hawke joined the cast in the third season, and Priah Ferguson was promoted to the main cast. Brett Gelman had recurring roles in the second and third seasons, before being promoted to the main cast in the fourth. Joseph Quinn, Eduardo Franco and Jamie Campbell Bower joined the main cast for the fourth season.

This list includes the series' main cast, all guest stars deemed to have had recurring roles throughout the series, and any other guest who is otherwise notable.

Overview

Main cast

Recurring cast

Main characters

Joyce Byers

 Portrayed by Winona Ryder
 Appears in: Season 1, Season 2, Season 3, Season 4
 Status: Alive

Joyce Byers is the mother of Jonathan Byers and Will Byers and is divorced from their father Lonnie Byers. Joyce is a very caring and strong-willed woman who works as a retail clerk at Melvald's General Store in downtown Hawkins. She was born and raised in Hawkins and she attended Hawkins High School with Hopper and Bob.

In season three, she is planning to sell her house and move out of Hawkins, much to Hopper’s dismay who tries to convince her to go on a date with him. Even though she does have feelings for him, Joyce tries to avoid getting into another relationship. She is mainly more interested in figuring out why the magnets in her house keep falling off her fridge and while investigating the reason behind this, she and Hopper uncover a Russian conspiracy. After infiltrating a Russian lab beneath the new Starcourt Mall, where the Russians have opened another portal into the Upside Down, Joyce is forced to close the portal by turning off the Russian machine used to open it with Hopper in the room, and Hopper ends up being presumably dead. Joyce becomes a mother figure to Eleven after taking her in when Hopper supposedly died. The Byers family and Eleven move to California three months after Hopper's supposed death.

Joyce has a stay-at-home job and receives a package from Russia carrying a doll, which has a note inside that reveals Hopper is alive. She and Murray call the number on the note and contact "Enzo", a prison guard that Hopper has bribed, who demands $40,000 in exchange for Hopper's freedom. Joyce obtains the money and flies to Alaska with Murray Bauman, where they meet Yuri Ismaylov, a Russian smuggler and pilot that smuggles American goods into the Russian prison camp. Realizing the profit that can be made, Yuri Ismaylov drugs Joyce and Murray and flies them to Russia. En route, Joyce and Murray knock out Yuri and crash in the wilderness. They force Yuri to take them to the prison camp, where Murray impersonates Yuri, while Joyce and Yuri act as hostages. The two witness Hopper fight the Demogorgon, but Joyce manages to rescue him and reunites with him.

Jim Hopper

 Portrayed by David Harbour
 Appears in: Season 1, Season 2, Season 3, Season 4
 Status: Alive

James "Jim" Hopper, nicknamed "Hop", is the Hawkins chief of police. Hopper has lived in Hawkins nearly all his life, having attended high school with Joyce and Bob. Hopper divorced after his young daughter Sarah died of cancer, which caused him to lapse into alcoholism. Eventually, he grows to be more responsible, saving Will from the Demogorgon as well as taking Eleven in as his adopted daughter.

In season three, he tries to break up Mike and Eleven since their relationship is moving too fast for him while trying to win over Joyce romantically. Through Joyce, he gets involved in an investigation regarding the supernatural, and they uncover a Russian conspiracy. He is seemingly killed in an explosion under the mall caused by a Russian machine used to open a portal to the Upside Down. In a teaser trailer for season four ("From Russia, with love..." - released on February 14, 2020), he is shown alive in Russia.

Having survived the mall explosion, Hopper is captured by Russians and is taken to a prison camp in Kamchatka, where he and other prisoners work on constructing a railroad track. While there, Hopper bribes a prison guard named Dmitri Antonov and works with him to escape the prison camp. Hopper manages to escape to a nearby town, but he is recaptured. After Antonov is revealed to be a corrupt guard, both he and Hopper are imprisoned together. During a feast, Hopper realizes he and the other prisoners are being plumped to be easy prey for an upcoming battle with the Demogorgon. He lights his weapon on fire, holding the Demogorgon away long enough for Joyce to lead Hopper to safety. Hopper and Joyce reunite and finally profess their romantic feelings for one another. Hopper, Joyce, Murray, Antonov and Yuri discover a number of creatures from the Upside Down being studied in the prison. Realizing their children are in danger, they work together to kill the creatures, weakening the Upside Down's power and giving the kids an advantage in their fight against Vecna. Hopper and Joyce then return to Hawkins, and Hopper reunites with Eleven. However, the Upside Down begins to engulf Hawkins.

Mike Wheeler

 Portrayed by Finn Wolfhard
 Appears in: Season 1, Season 2, Season 3, Season 4
 Status: Alive

Michael "Mike" Wheeler is the son of Karen and Ted Wheeler, younger brother of Nancy and older brother of Holly, and is friends with Lucas, Dustin and Will. Mike is an intelligent and conscientious student who is committed to Lucas, Dustin and Will. In their Dungeons and Dragons party, Mike is their Paladin and usually plays the role of Dungeon Master. He develops feelings for Eleven after taking her in and helping her escape the bad men. Eleven also helps him and his friends find Will. At the end of season one, Mike asks Eleven to the Snow Ball (school dance) and he kisses Eleven, much to her surprise. However, the Demogorgon appears and Eleven says her goodbyes to Mike as she seemingly dies, killing the Demogorgon.

In season two, he feels upset at the fact that Eleven is gone. He calls her every night, hoping she will one day return. He grows irritated with the party and has a rocky relationship with Max at first. Will reveals his apparent flashbacks to the Upside Down to Mike and he accompanies Joyce, Bob and Will to the lab when Will's health deteriorates. When Eleven reappears, he is grateful that they do not have to fight the battle without her but angry at Hopper for keeping her hidden for the past year. Mike is key on getting Will’s memory back to tell the group to close the gate. Before Eleven leaves to close the gate, Mike tells her he cannot lose her again and she promises him that he will not. A month after Eleven closes the gate, the two attend the Snow Ball together and share yet another kiss.

The next summer, the two are dating, but Hopper manages to separate them because they are spending too much time together. When Eleven and Max realize Mike has been lying about his grandmother being sick she eventually breaks up with Mike. However, the two reconcile at the hospital waiting for Nancy. While Eleven tries to find Billy, Mike expresses concern that everyone is careless with Eleven‘s powers and confesses that he loves Eleven. He tries to project his feelings to her after she gets bitten but struggles to find the right words. On the day that Eleven and the Byers family move away, Mike promises Eleven that he will keep in contact and schedules visits at Thanksgiving and Christmas. Eleven then tells Mike that she loves him and kisses him before she leaves Hawkins with the Byers family.

In the spring of 1986, Mike and Dustin join the Hellfire Club, Hawkins High School's Dungeons and Dragons club, led by Eddie Munson. Though Lucas is also a member, he has committed himself to the Hawkins HS basketball team, putting him at odds with Mike and Dustin, who urge him to side with them—the "nerds and freaks." He and Eleven maintain a long-distance relationship with letters, and for spring break, Mike flies to California to visit Eleven and Will at their new home in Lenora Hills. Though Eleven insisted to Mike that she had friends and was living a semi-popular lifestyle, Mike discovers that she was lying to hide the heavy bullying she experiences from other students. He witnesses Angela and a gang of girls humiliate Eleven at Rink-o-Mania, and he is shocked when Eleven retaliates with physical violence. The following day, Mike and Eleven argue when she expresses her dissatisfaction in the relationship, pointing out Mike's strange reluctance to say he loves her. When Eleven is arrested for attacking Angela, Mike, Will, and Jonathan are distressed and unsure how to help her—until Sam Owens sends agents to inform them that Eleven has accepted his offer to begin training to get her powers back. At the Byers home, the three are being guarded by two agents, until U.S. Army soldiers attack the house, forcing them to escape with the help of Jonathan's friend Argyle, bringing a wounded Agent Harmon with them. After Harmon dies and leaves them with a phone number to reach Owens and Eleven, Mike enlists the help of Dustin's girlfriend Suzie, who lives in Salt Lake City, Utah. There, Suzie provides them coordinates for the Nina Project, which is in Nevada. Along the way, Mike expresses his inner anxieties regarding his relationship with Eleven, scared that she will eventually realize that she doesn't need him as he needs her. As the U.S. Army closes in on Eleven, Mike and the California Crew arrive, giving Eleven a chance to destroy her attackers and their transportation. Together, they venture to a Surfer Boy Pizza location in Nevada to build Eleven a sensory deprivation tank for her to travel into Max's mind to protect her from Vecna. When Vecna overpowers Eleven, Mike professes his love for her, giving her the strength to overpower him. The California Crew then returns to Hawkins, where Mike and the others prepare for a final battle with the Upside Down, which has leaked into their town.

Eleven

 Portrayed by Millie Bobby Brown
 Appears in: Season 1, Season 2, Season 3, Season 4
 Status: Alive

Eleven is a telekinetic girl who is the sole match for the creatures of the Upside Down. She later becomes Jim Hopper's adoptive daughter and Mike Wheeler's girlfriend.

Born to Terry Ives, Eleven was abducted by Dr. Martin Brenner at birth and taken to Hawkins National Laboratories to hone her telekinetic abilities alongside other gifted children. In 1979, she is bullied by the older numbers for exhibiting a poor usage of her powers, but she finds kindness in a lab orderly, who encourages and supports her. Eventually, Eleven demonstrates great power, but she is targeted by the older children once again and threatened with death. The lab orderly urges Eleven to escape Hawkins Lab, but she frees the orderly, who reveals himself to be Henry Creel / Subject 001 (One). One proceeds to kill everyone in Hawkins Lab, with the exceptions of Brenner and Eleven. When One attempts to convince Eleven to join him in a mission for human dominance, Eleven rejects him, and the two fight. The adult One overpowers the eight-year-old Eleven, but Eleven's powerful, loving memory of her mother gives her the strength to overpower One, sending him into the Upside Down, where he becomes Vecna. Eleven falls into a coma, and her abilities, memory, and intellect are reset when she awakens.

After her escape at the beginning of season one, Eleven is befriended by Mike, Dustin, and Lucas, who believe she can help them in finding Will. In the kids' Dungeons and Dragons party, she is the Mage. She spends the majority of the first season hiding and running from the "bad men", meaning the lab workers. She helps the boys locate Will, and she fends off threats for them along the way. In the season one finale, she presumably dies after fighting the Demogorgon, though she actually survived and was sent to the Upside Down alongside the Demogorgon.

In season two, following the events of the season one finale, Eleven is shown to escape the Upside Down through a gate in a hallway in Hawkins Middle School. Hopper then becomes a father figure to Eleven, though he hides her from Mike, Dustin and Lucas for her safety. Eleven grows increasingly frustrated at this isolation from the other world, and she temporarily flees Hawkins in search of her biological mother, Terry Ives. She later ventures to Chicago, Illinois, where she meets a girl named Kali (subject 008 / Eight) and her group of vengeful killers. Despite going through a journey of self-discovery, Eleven ultimately returns to Hawkins, reuniting with Mike and her friends. She closes the gate she opened the year prior in Hawkins Lab, ending the Mind Flayer's connection to Hawkins. Hopper legally adopts her as his daughter.

In season three, Eleven is actively dating Mike, much to Hopper's chagrin. When Hopper attempts to separate Mike and Eleven, he forces Mike to lie to her. She suspects this ruse, and she consults Max Mayfield, who helps her discover her individuality. When the Mind Flayer's threat emerges once again, Eleven is pursued once more. After being bitten by the Mind Flayer, Eleven loses her powers, as well as Hopper at the end of the season and moves with the Byers family to Lenora Hills, California.

In spring 1986, Eleven has attended Lenora Hills High School alongside Will, and here she experiences incessant, daily bullying by fellow classmate Angela and her friends. When Mike visits El and Will, Angela and her friends gang up on Eleven at Rink-o-Mania, and Eleven strikes Angela in the face with a roller skate in retaliation. She is taken into police custody, but Dr. Sam Owens intercepts her arrest, offering her a chance to restore her abilities. After she accepts, Owens takes her to a facility in Nevada, where she reunites with Brenner. She is forced to confront her traumatic memories in Hawkins Lab taking her to a facility where she relives her repressed memories of her time at Hawkins Lab. After recalling the lab massacre, Eleven finds that her abilities are restored, and once she learns of the Hawkins Gang's plan to kill Henry / One / Vecna, she attempts to travel back to Hawkins with Owens, though Brenner intervenes and insists on keeping Eleven. After the U.S. Army attacks the silo lab, Brenner attempts to flee with a sedated Eleven, only to be shot. Eleven manages to save herself, and she refuses to forgive a dying Brenner. She later telepathically saves Max from Vecna and revives her when she succumbs to her injuries.

Dustin Henderson

 Portrayed by Gaten Matarazzo
 Appears in: Season 1, Season 2, Season 3, Season 4
 Status: Alive

Dustin Henderson is a friend of Mike, Will, and Lucas, and a goofy and quick-witted boy whose cleidocranial dysplasia causes him to lisp. In the Dungeons and Dragons party, Dustin is the Bard and has arguably the most extensive knowledge of the game, particularly the monsters. He has a crush on Nancy, and while both he and Lucas have feelings for Max in season two, Lucas and Max ultimately end up together. He also befriends Steve, who gives him advice on how to make girls like him.

Prior to season three, Dustin spends a month at a science camp and, thanks to Steve's advice, is able to get a girlfriend, Suzie, whom he claims is a genius and is "hotter than Phoebe Cates." His friends are skeptical as to whether or not she actually exists as he is unable to get in contact with her over his makeshift radio tower, "Cerebro." Dustin instead discovers the coded Russian transmission and, along with Steve, Robin, and Erica, ventures into the Russian's underground lair. He later proves Suzie's existence when he contacts her for Planck's constant in the season finale (She forces him to sing "Never Ending Story")

Now in high school, Dustin, Mike, and Lucas join a Dungeons & Dragons club named "The Hellfire Club," led by the eccentric Eddie Munson. After Chrissy Cunningham is killed by an unknown entity, Dustin dubs the entity as "Vecna." During a plan to kill Vecna, Dustin and Eddie successfully distract the demo-bats away from Steve, Nancy, and Robin, but become trapped in Eddie’s trailer. Protecting Dustin, Eddie exits the trailer and lures the bats away from the trailer. While fighting them, Eddie is knocked down and his flesh is rendered, leaving him mortally wounded. Dustin comforts Eddie as he dies. Two days later, upon seeing Eddie’s uncle Wayne putting up a missing poster for Eddie, Dustin informs him of Eddie’s death, calling him a hero that saved the town that treated him horridly.

Lucas Sinclair

 Portrayed by Caleb McLaughlin
 Appears in: Season 1, Season 2, Season 3, Season 4
 Status: Alive

Lucas is the eldest child of Sue and Charles Sinclair, elder brother of Erica, and a friend of Mike, Will, and Dustin. Lucas is wary of Eleven at first and blatantly distrustful of her, but befriends her later.

In high school, Lucas joins the Hellfire Club and the basketball team but struggles to make time for both clubs. At the cemetery, he, along with Dustin and Steve, helps Max escape Vecna and comforts her after she escapes.

He finds himself confronted by the senior captain of the basketball team, Jason Carver while Max is under Vecna’s curse. A fight ensues with Jason briefly overpowering Lucas, however after he sees Max beginning to levitate he summons the strength to continue which results in him knocking out Jason.

Lucas observes in horror as Max begins to succumb to Vecna's Curse, her bones are crushed and she loses her sight. This leaves Lucas devastated as he cries hysterically as Max dies in his arms, before Eleven psychically resurrects Max, barely saving her. At the end of the season he is seen reading to Max as she is laying in the hospital comatose. Spores from the Upside Down are seen from the hospital window as Lucas and Erica observe.

Nancy Wheeler

 Portrayed by Natalia Dyer
 Appears in: Season 1, Season 2, Season 3, Season 4
 Status: Alive

Nancy Wheeler is the oldest daughter of Karen and Ted Wheeler and the older sister of Mike and Holly. Nancy is something of an outcast at school until Steve Harrington takes an interest in her.

Their relationship lasts until the ending of season two when she starts dating Jonathan after a little help from Murray ("So get it over with!"). She is very proficient with firearms, despite a noticeable lack of training or practice. She has been seen using pistols, revolvers, rifles and shotguns.

In the third season, Nancy and Jonathan work as interns at the Hawkins Post, where Nancy is subject to workplace harassment and sexual discrimination from her male superiors. She and Jonathan are eventually fired for pursuing a story against their editor's wishes, but Nancy continues to investigate the case, which leads her to multiple encounters with the Flayed being controlled by the Mind Flayer from the Upside Down through Billy.

In season four, Nancy begins working as an editor at her school paper alongside her coworker Fred Benson. When Chrissy is murdered by Vecna, Nancy and Fred investigate her crime scene, where Nancy questions Max's neighbor and learns of Victor Creel, a man who murdered his family and was incarcerated at Pennhurst Asylum. When Fred is killed by Vecna, Nancy reunites with the gang and is informed of Vecna. Later, Nancy is put into a trance by Vecna and learns he is actually Henry Creel, Victor Creel's son who actually killed his family and framed their deaths on his father. Eventually, she, Steve, and Robin set Vecna on fire before shooting him several times.

Jonathan Byers

 Portrayed by Charlie Heaton
 Appears in: Season 1, Season 2, Season 3, Season 4
 Status: Alive

Jonathan Byers is the older brother of Will and the oldest son of Joyce. He is shy and reserved, and is considered an outsider at Hawkins High. He is an aspiring photographer, and very close with his mother and brother.

Jonathan starts dating Nancy at the end of season two. They both become interns at the Hawkins Post in season three, but are eventually fired by their editor for pursuing a story. He helps his friends defeat the Mind Flayer before he and his family decide to move to Lenora Hills, California.

In the fourth season, Jonathan makes a new friend named Argyle. Jonathan, who planned to attend college with Nancy, reveals to Argyle that he was accepted to a community college in Lenora Hills. After gaining the number of NINA, they seek the help of Suzie who resides in Salt Lake City, Utah. Suzie locates NINA's coordinates, and the group arrives there while Eleven is facing off against the U.S. Army's troops. Jonathan helps the group build an isolation tank for Eleven to fight Vecna, and later returns to Hawkins only to find it being infiltrated by the Upside Down.

Karen Wheeler

 Portrayed by Cara Buono
 Appears in: Season 1, Season 2, Season 3, Season 4
 Status: Alive

Karen Wheeler is the mother of Nancy, Mike and Holly and wife of Ted. Although a loving mother at heart, she remains largely clueless about her children's activities up until the destruction of Hawkins by Vecna, and often tries to directly connect with them rather than trying to understand them. Nancy believes she only married her husband to fit the image of a nuclear family.

At the end of the second season and the beginning of the third, she develops a sexual attraction towards Billy Hargrove, partly out of boredom with her husband, but ultimately decides against acting on these feelings to avoid splitting her family apart; her brief submission to them, however, indirectly results in Billy being possessed by the Mind Flayer. Later, she finally connects with Nancy by encouraging her to continue pursuing the story she was fired for working on against her editor's orders.

Martin Brenner

 Portrayed by Matthew Modine
 Appears in: Season 1, Season 2, Season 4
 Status: Deceased
 Died in: Season 4

Dr. Martin Brenner, who is referred to as "Papa" by Eleven and the other children he experimented on, is the head scientist of Hawkins Laboratory and the experiments performed there. He is a callous and manipulative scientist, having abducted Eleven from her mother, Terry Ives, whom he later subjected to electroshock therapy to destroy her mind and thoughts. Brenner then put Eleven through numerous experiments, one of which saw her use her abilities to accidentally establish a link to the Upside Down. After Eleven escapes the lab, Brenner and his team hunt for her throughout Hawkins while covering up the actions of the Demogorgon they unknowingly let loose. Brenner is apparently killed by the Demogorgon in the first-season finale, though a former worker named Ray claimed Brenner was still alive during his attempt to plea for his life to Eleven and Kali.

In season four, Brenner is revealed to still be alive and working with Dr. Owens on a project called "NINA", which they hope can restore Eleven's powers. NINA is a specialized sensory deprivation tank and experimental drugs that allow Eleven to vividly recall memories of her time in the lab. Flashbacks to 1979 show that Brenner was experimenting on at least thirteen children alongside Eleven until all of them except for her were murdered by subject 001 (Henry Creel/Vecna), whom Eleven overpowered and banished to the Upside Down. The exertion put Eleven in a coma that erased most of her memories and weakened her powers, which Brenner began attempting to restore. Brenner's experiments on Eleven throughout the first season are revealed to have been attempts to locate Henry, whose powers he sought to replicate in the other children.

The NINA project ultimately succeeds in restoring Eleven's powers, but U.S. Army troops led by Lt. Col. Jack Sullivan storm the facility and kill the staff, believing Eleven to be responsible for a string of murders in Hawkins (which were in fact committed by Vecna). Brenner is shot by a sniper while attempting to escape with Eleven, who overpowers the Army.

Will Byers

 Portrayed by Noah Schnapp
 Appears in: Season 1, Season 2, Season 3, Season 4
 Status: Alive

William "Will" Byers is the younger brother of Jonathan and the youngest son of Joyce, is the shy, kind, timid, and often the most overlooked member of the party. In the group's Dungeons and Dragons party, Will is the wizard, but later occasionally plays the role of Dungeon Master; he is referred to as "Will the Wise". In season one, he vanishes somewhere near "Mirkwood" after encountering the monster that escaped through a rift to the "Upside Down", an alternate dimension discovered by the Hawkins Laboratory scientists. Schnapp was promoted to series regular for the second season, after recurring in the first.

In season two, he began to experience flashbacks to his time in the Upside-Down, with visions of a large shadow monster trying to attack him.  The monster eventually possessed Will, and was later dubbed by Dustin as "The Mind Flayer".  Joyce, Mike, Jonathan, and Nancy were able to drive the Mind Flayer out of Will, returning him to normal.

In season three, his friends' preoccupations with their girlfriends lead to Will feeling like the odd-man-out. His link to the Mind Flayer helps the group know when it is active. At the end of the season, he moves out of Hawkins with Joyce, Jonathan and Eleven.

In season four, Will, Mike, Jonathan, and Argyle recover Eleven and help her build a sensory deprivation  tank through which she can fight Vecna. Upon returning to Hawkins, which has been ravaged by a series of faults opened by Vecna from the Upside Down, Will begins feeling the Upside Down's influence again—recognizing Vecna as the presence he felt all along.

Schnapp has confirmed that Will is gay and is attracted to Mike. The show has hinted at this through the first three seasons, but it was made more apparent during scenes in the fourth season. Will tries to boost Mike's confidence that they will find Eleven as they drive to the Nina project site. Later, he is comforted by Jonathan who knows that Will is different mentions that he will accept him, saying "you're my brother and there is nothing in this world that will ever change that."

Max Mayfield 

 Portrayed by Sadie Sink
 Appears in: Season 2, Season 3, Season 4
 Status: Alive

Maxine "Max" Mayfield is Susan Hargrove's biological daughter, Billy's younger stepsister, an avid skateboarder, and the tomboy of the group who catches the attention of Lucas when it becomes known that she has the highest score in Dig Dug. Max is often shown at odds with Billy.

In season three, she and Lucas are dating after supposed multiple breakups. Eleven approaches her to seek advice when she suspects that Mike is lying to her, and Max convinces her that Mike might have done that to play along with his friends. Max helps Eleven in exploring the outside world, making them close friends. She is also shown to be a fan of Wonder Woman.

In season four, Max struggles with coping after Billy's death, which had lasting reverberations on her family situation. Her parents split up, and Max and her mother Susan moved into a trailer park. Max has isolated herself from everyone, including Lucas, and she frequently attends the counselor's office due to her PTSD symptoms. She witnesses Eddie and Chrissy go into his trailer together and later sees him flee. After learning of Chrissy's death, she relays this information to Dustin, so they track down one of Eddie's friends to learn Eddie's location. After recalling Chrissy attending the counselor's office before her death, Max, Dustin, and Steve break into the school and find her file, as well as Fred Benson’s, Vecna's second victim. She learns that both Chrissy and Fred suffered PTSD symptoms similar to hers, realizing that she is Vecna's next target. She writes letters to her friends and family and reads Billy's at his grave. She is put into a trance by Vecna, but Lucas, Steve, and Dustin learn from Nancy and Robin that music can help her escape Vecna, and play her favorite song, Kate Bush's "Running Up That Hill", saving her from Vecna. After Steve, Nancy, Robin, and Eddie dive into the Upside Down, Max and the gang return to the Wheeler residence and communicate with the Upside Down gang using a Lite-Brite. They go to Eddie's trailer and rescue them from the Upside Down. After Vecna shows Nancy his plans for Hawkins' destruction, the Hawkins gang plots to kill Vecna. Realizing she can provide a distraction to give the others time, Max volunteers as bait for Vecna. In the season's final battle, Max, Lucas, and Erica go to Creel House, awaiting Max's possession to give Nancy, Steve, and Robin an opening to Vecna. When Vecna possesses Max, she retreats to the safety of her favorite memory—the 1984 Snow Ball, where she and Lucas first danced—but this fails to work for long. Eleven enters the fray within Max's mind, but she is overpowered by Vecna, who begins killing Max. At the last second, Eleven manages to save Max from Vecna's final blow. However, moments later, Max dies from her injuries in Lucas' arms, but Eleven is able to resurrect her, though she remains comatose. Max ends up at the hospital, still in a coma, with Lucas at her bedside.

Steve Harrington

 Portrayed by Joe Keery
 Appears in: Season 1, Season 2, Season 3, Season 4
 Status: Alive

Steve Harrington, who is referred to as Steve "The Hair" Harrington, is a popular student at school. He tries to develop a relationship with Nancy and bullies Jonathan, though he comes to regret this.

Keery was promoted to series regular from the second season onwards, after recurring in the first. Steve then played a more prominent role, developing a brotherly relationship with Dustin, and becoming a self-described babysitter for the main group of kids. Steve is the owner of what the friends call "The Bat", a baseball bat with multiple large nails driven into the head of it, made by Jonathan to fight the Demogorgon. Steve uses the bat to fight off a pack of adolescent Demogorgons that attack Hawkins in the second season.

In season three, Steve works at Starcourt Mall at Scoops Ahoy with Robin Buckley. He, Robin and Dustin discover a secret Russian base under Starcourt Mall, where soon later Erica joins. Steve along with Robin is later imprisoned by the Russians. He admits to having a crush on Robin, but is rejected soon after learning that Robin is lesbian.

In season four, Steve continues working with Robin at the local video store. He teams up with Robin, Nancy, Dustin, Max, and Lucas for much of the season, investigating the Creel house to search for and learn about Vecna, and also locating Eddie. After they discover a new gate to the Upside Down in a lake, Steve dives down to investigate and is pulled through, but eventually makes it back with Nancy, Robin, and Eddie after they follow him in. During the final plan to defeat Vecna, Steve returns to the Creel house in the Upside Down with Nancy and Robin to kill Vecna, and the three succeed in severely maiming him with Molotov cocktails before he escapes. Vecna's plan nonetheless succeeds, and Steve, Robin and Dustin volunteer to help townsfolk affected by the "earthquake" created by Vecna's gates.

Billy Hargrove

 Portrayed by Dacre Montgomery
 Appears in: Season 2, Season 3, Season 4
 Status: Deceased
 Died in: Season 3

William "Billy" Hargrove is the careless, rash, and overly protective stepbrother of Max. His own behavior is revealed to be a consequence of the physical abuse he himself is subjected to by his father.

In season three, he becomes the main host for the Mind Flayer.  Eleven, having looked into his memories earlier, reminds Billy of his happy memories with his mother, allowing him to break free from the possession and sacrifice himself to save Eleven from the Mind Flayer. After the Mind Flayer is defeated, Billy apologizes to Max for all his wrongdoings as he dies in Max's arms.

In season four, Billy appears as a hallucination when Max is put into a trance by Vecna, where Billy blames her for his death. Max reveals that a part of her is happy that he died but that she still cared about him and loved him.

Bob Newby

 Portrayed by Sean Astin
 Appears in: Season 2, Season 3
 Status: Deceased
 Died in: Season 2

Bob Newby is a former classmate of Joyce and Hopper, who runs the Hawkins RadioShack, and becomes Joyce's boyfriend in Season Two, as well as a mentor figure for Will. An amiable man, he often refers to himself as a "superhero" and sees a future with the family.

The Byers initially try to keep him out of the knowledge of the Upside Down, but end up relying on his help to locate Hopper when he figures out Will's delusions.  He, Hopper, an unconscious Will, Mike, Joyce, and Owens are eventually trapped by the Mind Flayer in Hawkins Lab with the power out. As the only one capable of resetting the breakers and unlocking the doors, he volunteers to do so. After succeeding, he was attacked, killed, and eaten by Demo-Dogs in front of Joyce and Hopper. His legacy lived on after season three, with Joyce still mourning his loss.

Sam Owens

 Portrayed by Paul Reiser
 Appears in: Season 2, Season 3, Season 4
 Status: Alive

Dr. Sam Owens is a United States Department of Energy executive who replaces Brenner at Hawkins Laboratory. Owens is as committed to science research and stubborn as his predecessor, but much more empathetic to the residents of Hawkins Lab. Owens is in charge of studying and treating Will's lingering traumatic episodes from the Upside Down. He is fired from the lab at the end of season two after it is attacked by monsters at the Upside Down, and provides Hopper with a birth certificate for Eleven naming her Hopper's adopted daughter.

In season three, Jim Hopper calls Sam Owens to inform him a gate has been opened in Hawkins. In the finale of the season, Dr. Owens and his men fly to Hawkins and raid the Russians' secret base. During the raid, Sam sees a gate inside the wall that is not fully closed.

In season four, Owens has secretly begun working with Brenner on a program called "NINA" that may be able to bring back Eleven's powers. Owens recruits Eleven to participate in the program after a string of murders in Hawkins; she initially revolted after learning of Brenner's involvement, but the brief resurgence of her powers during an escape attempt convinces her to stay. The project ultimately succeeds in restoring Eleven's powers, but U.S. Army forces led by Lt. Col. Jack Sullivan storm the facility, believing Eleven to be responsible for the Hawkins murders. Sullivan attempts to force Eleven's whereabouts out of Owens, but Eleven destroys the Army's vehicles.

Robin Buckley

 Portrayed by Maya Hawke
 Appears in: Season 3, Season 4
 Status: Alive
Robin Buckley is Steve's coworker at the Starcourt Mall's ice cream parlor, "Scoops Ahoy!". Robin decodes a Russian radio message and finds the base along with Steve, Dustin, and Erica. While stating she was obsessed with Steve in high school, the influence of truth serum reveals that she actually pined for the attention of one of Steve's many admirers, Tammy Thompson, revealing she is a lesbian. In season four, Robin has a crush on fellow classmate Vickie.

In season four, Robin continues working with Steve at the local video store. After locating Eddie, Nancy and Robin go to the library and look up information on Creel, learning that Creel blamed his family's murders on a demon, which they believe to be Vecna. The two visit Creel at Pankhurst Asylum, where he recounts his family's murders. Later, she goes with Nancy and Steve to the Creel house in the Upside Down as part of their plan to defeat Vecna.

Erica Sinclair
 Portrayed by Priah Ferguson
 Appears in: Season 2, Season 3, Season 4
 Status: Alive

Erica Sinclair is Sue and Charles Sinclair's youngest child and is Lucas' younger sister. Introduced in the second season as a recurring character, she was promoted to series regular in the third season. She aids Dustin, Steve, and Robin in infiltrating the Russian base beneath Starcourt Mall. During these events, Dustin convinces Erica that, like himself and his friends, she is a nerd and that she should embrace that. At the end of the third season, she is given Will's Dungeons & Dragons manuals. She is very snarky, foul-mouthed, sassy and often thinks of Lucas and his friends as nerds, though she can also be nice at times. In season four, she has embraced her nerdy side and joins the Hawkins High School's Hellfire Club in her brother's place after demonstrating proficient knowledge of Dungeons & Dragons. She serves as a lookout and communicator between the many groups in their plan to defeat Vecna.

Murray Bauman

 Portrayed by Brett Gelman
 Appears in: Season 2, Season 3, Season 4
 Status: Alive

Murray Bauman is a private investigator and conspiracy theorist hired to investigate Barbara Holland's disappearance. First introduced in season two, he assists Nancy and Jonathan in their mission to shut down Hawkins National Laboratory. 

In season three, he helps Joyce and Hopper infiltrate the secret underground base in Starcourt Mall, where the Soviets had been building a machine capable of opening a gate to the Upside Down. He is also shown to be fluent in Russian. In season 4, he and Joyce travel to Kamchatka to rescue Hopper from imprisonment. There, he disguises himself as Yuri Ismaylov to rescue Hopper and burns demodogs to aid the kids in Hawkins against Vecna. He is a dramatic, bearded and balding man who loves vodka and often drinks it to think; he also can predict good couples, for example, Nancy and Jonathan, and Joyce and Hopper.

Vecna

 Portrayed by Jamie Campbell Bower (adult) and Raphael Luce (child)
 Appears in: Season 4
 Status: Alive

Vecna is a murderous being in the Upside Down, who first appears in season four. He preys on individuals reeling from past traumas, and his method of killing involves inducing nightmarish visions before telekinetically breaking their bones and imploding their skulls. He operates out of the Creel House in the Upside Down. He is revealed to have been the main antagonist of the series, being responsible for the events that terrorized Hawkins in the previous seasons, all the way back to Will's disappearance in Season 1.

Vecna is revealed to be Henry Creel, Victor Creel's son who was born with telepathic abilities. Henry grew up with a deeply misanthropic view of humanity after being ostracized throughout his childhood. He came to resent his family for their perceived hypocrisy, having learned that his father mistakenly bombed the home of an innocent family during World War II. In the 1950s, he terrorized and murdered his mother and sister in his family's house using his powers, but the exertion put him in a coma while his father was arrested for the murders and placed in a psychiatric institution. Henry was placed in the care of Dr. Brenner, who made him test subject One in Brenner's attempts to replicate Henry's powers in other children. As an adult, Henry was made an orderly at Hawkins Lab to help oversee Brenner's experiments on a number of superpowered children, including Eleven. Brenner placed an implant (dubbed "Soteria") in Henry's neck that suppressed his powers. In 1979, Henry befriended Eleven amidst her being bullied by other subjects, and pointed out to her that she and the rest of the lab's occupants were prisoners. Sympathizing with Henry's plight after witnessing him being punished by Brenner, Eleven destroyed the Soteria implant, restoring his powers. Henry massacred all the other children and most of the lab's staff and attempted to kill Eleven after she refused to help him eradicate the rest of humanity. Eleven overpowered Henry and sent him into the Upside Down, where he became disfigured by lightning injuries and prolonged exposure to its toxic environment. Henry discovered various creatures residing in the realm, and used his powers to control them, the Mind Flayer being the result of his manipulations.

In 1986, after spending several years remaining dormant and growing stronger while controlling the Upside Down, Henry begins terrorizing Hawkins himself, murdering several Hawkins High School students, including Chrissy Cunningham, Fred Benson, and Patrick McKinney. Dustin and Eddie dub him "Vecna" based on his similarities to the Dungeons & Dragonss character of the same name. Vecna nearly kills Max until her friends find a way to break his influence using music. He later possesses Nancy, reveals to her his past, and then shows her a vision of the future where Hawkins is torn apart by rifts before releasing her. Nancy and her friends deduce that Vecna needs to open four gates to the Upside Down to enact his plan, three of which have been spawned at the site of each of his murders. Max attempts to bait Vecna while her friends travel to the Upside Down to kill him. Eleven enters Max's mind and confronts Vecna, who reveals himself as the mastermind behind the Upside Down's past attacks on Hawkins. Vecna possesses and kills Max before Eleven overpowers him, while Steve, Nancy, and Robin severely injure his physical form before he escapes. Though Eleven revives Max, her brief death opens a fourth gate to the Upside Down, causing rifts to tear through Hawkins, allowing the Upside Down to begin infiltrating the town.

Argyle
 Portrayed by Eduardo Franco
 Appears in: Season 4
 Status: Alive

Argyle is a student at Lenora Hills High School, where Eleven, Will, and Jonathan now attend in Lenora Hills, California.

Argyle becomes Jonathan's best friend, and he provides Jonathan needed counsel, helping him relax with his stoner mentality. He works as a pizza delivery driver for Surfer Boy Pizza. When U.S. Army soldiers attack the Byers home in search of Eleven, Argyle provides getaway transportation for Mike, Will, and Jonathan. He goes on to join the boys in their own attempt to find her. During their travels, they seek help from Dustin's long-distance girlfriend Suzie in Salt Lake City, and Argyle falls in love with the hacker's older sister, Eden. Argyle is pivotal in the California Crew's efforts to aid the Hawkins Gang's plot to defeat Vecna, helping create a sensory deprivation tank for Eleven at a Surfer Boy Pizza location in Nevada. He then accompanies Eleven, Mike, Will, and Jonathan back to Hawkins.

Eddie Munson
 Portrayed by Joseph Quinn
 First Appearance: Season 4 "Chapter One: The Hellfire Club"
 Appears in: Season 4
 Status: Deceased 
 Died in: Season 4 "Chapter Nine: The Piggyback"

Edward "Eddie" Munson is an eccentric Hawkins High School student and president of Hawkins High's Dungeons & Dragons-themed "Hellfire Club", where he befriends Mike and Dustin.  He lives with his uncle, Wayne Munson, and while the two are not seen onscreen together, it is made clear that their relationship is very close.

While selling drugs to Chrissy Cunningham, Eddie watches as Vecna telepathically kills Chrissy. He screams in horror and runs away. He realizes that the authorities will not believe his story and is later located by Dustin, Steve, Max, and Robin, who explain to him the existence of the Upside Down. The local police name Eddie as their chief suspect in Vecna's murders. The school basketball team, led by Chrissy's boyfriend Jason Carver, attempts to hunt him down, with Jason believing Eddie to be the leader of a Satanic cult. The group of friends realize they must work to clear Eddie's name. When they locate a new gate to the Upside Down in a lake, he dives down after Steve gets pulled in and experiences the Upside Down for the first time. In preparation for the final battle against Vecna, the group purchases and crafts weapons, with Eddie and Dustin re-entering the Upside Down to distract the demobats protecting Vecna's lair. As part of the final plan, Eddie plays Metallica's "Master of Puppets" on his electric guitar. He later stays behind and sacrifices himself to further fend off the demobats. After Vecna's gates create large rifts that tear through Hawkins, the town still believes Eddie is responsible for the murders. Dustin meets Eddie's uncle and assures him that Eddie was a hero who died protecting the town that hates him.

Creatures of the Upside Down

Mind Flayer
Introduced in the second season as a malevolent semi-corporeal entity that resides in the parallel dimension known as the Upside Down, where every living thing in that reality serves as an extension of the Mind Flayer's hive mind and acts on the entity's desire to spread itself to Earth. The events of the first season allowed the Mind Flayer to terraform Hawkins secretly through Will Byers, who was infected during his time in the Upside Down and had unknowingly brought incubated Demogorgons with him.

In the second season, the Mind Flayer's existence was revealed as it implanted a piece of itself into Will through visions, while using adolescent Demogorgons to eliminate anyone who interfered in the terraforming. While the others managed to close the gate to sever the Mind Flayer's foothold, its ethereal fragment took refuge at Brimborn Steel Works after being "exorcised" from Will. During the events of season three, a new Gate opened by Russians allowed the Mind Flayer to have its isolated fragment create an organic vessel by infecting and possessing living beings and absorbing their entire biomass. The Mind Flayer nearly succeeded in killing Eleven, only to lose its foothold when Joyce and Hopper infiltrated the secret Russian laboratory and closed the new gate.

In the fourth season, the Mind Flayer is revealed to have been shaped and controlled by Henry Creel (Vecna), who discovered the entity as a formless mass in the Upside Down (after being sent there by Eleven) and morphed it into its spider-like appearance, owing to his childhood fascination with black widows. Hopper, Joyce, and Murray discover another fragment of the Mind Flayer inside a Russian research facility in Kamchatka, where it eventually breaks free and animates the other Demogorgons inside the facility. Hopper and Murray manage to kill the remaining creatures.

Demogorgons, Demodogs and Demobats

Predatory creatures from the Upside Down that serve as the Mind Flayer's initial invasion force, are murderous and violent with limited intelligence. Demogorgons start off as slug-like creatures that are incubated in a victim's body, growing into a tadpole-like creature and gradually molting into an adolescent form called a "demodog" before fully maturing. An adult demogorgon, played by Mark Steger, appears after a gateway to the Upside Down was accidentally opened in Hawkins, and demonstrated an apparent ability to create random rifts between the Upside Down and the normal world. Though that demogorgon, called the Demogorgon, was eventually destroyed, its abduction of Will Byers allowed the Mind Flayer to unleash a swarm of adolescent demogorgons upon Hawkins before they were all killed when their connection to the Mind Flayer was severed.

The end of the third season reveals another adult demogorgon, eventually called the Russian Demogorgon, being held captive by the Russians at a prison camp in Kamchatka, where prisoners are sometimes executed by being fed to the creature. In the fourth season, Hopper and his fellow prisoners are forced to fight the Russian Demogorgon. Hopper uses a flaming spear to hold back the creature while it ravages most of the other prisoners, while Joyce and Murray help him escape alongside Dmitri Antonov, a guard he bribed and befriended. The group discovers a number of demogorgons (as well as a fragment of the Mind Flayer) under study inside the prison. The creatures are accidentally let loose during a firefight between the prison guards and the Russian Demogorgon, but Hopper and Murray kill the remaining creatures and escape Russia.

A variant with wings like a bat called the Demobat also exists. The variant was introduced in the fourth season when Steve Harrington went through Watergate, the gate at the bottom of Lover's Lake which opened up when Patrick McKinney was killed by Vecna. The Demobats attacked Steve, but were fended off by him, Nancy Wheeler, Robin Buckley and Eddie Munson. Later, Eddie played "Master of Puppets" to distract the Demobats and ended up being killed by them. After Vecna was defeated, they fell to the ground and seemingly died.

The Flayed

A term for Earth-based beings that are possessed by the Mind Flayer, Will Byers being the first case during the second season until an ethereal fragment of the Mind Flayer was purged from his body. The isolated fragment later began possessing rats and eventually humans during the events of season three, having most of its hosts ingest toxic chemicals so they could gradually be melted down into materials for the Mind Flayer to create a proxy body to act through in its attempt to kill Eleven.

Recurring characters
The following is a list of guest characters that have recurring roles throughout the series. The characters are listed by the order in which they first appeared.

Introduced in season one
 Joe Chrest as Ted Wheeler, husband of Karen, father of teenager Nancy, middle-schooler Mike, and toddler Holly. Although the primary breadwinner for the family, he is often out of sync with his children and the emotional needs of his wife and frequently found asleep in a recliner chair, as well as a staunch conservative, making him a target of amusement for many characters.
 Twins Anniston and Tinsley Price as Holly Wheeler, daughter of Karen and Ted, younger sister of Nancy and Mike. Although Holly is quite young, she is far more aware of what happens in the town than her parents. In the fourth season, she is shown to be much more independent. 
 Randy Havens as Scott Clarke, the boys' teacher. He encourages their interest in science and technology and helps them whenever asked.
 Rob Morgan as Calvin Powell, one of Hopper's officers. He later becomes the Hawkins chief of police following Hopper's disappearance.
 John Paul Reynolds as Phil Callahan, another of Hopper's officers. Not nearly as serious as his partner, he still works hard in the search for Will Byers.
 Susan Shalhoub Larkin as Florence ("Flo"), the secretary at the Hawkins Police Station. She shows concern about Hopper's health.
 Shannon Purser as Barbara "Barb" Holland, an introvert and best friend of Nancy Wheeler. She is concerned that her friendship with Nancy may be threatened by Nancy's relationship with Steve. Barb is one of the first victims of the Demogorgon.
 Ross Partridge as Lonnie Byers, the ex-husband of Joyce Byers and biological father of Jonathan and Will. He has a much younger girlfriend named Cynthia.
 Catherine Dyer as Connie Frazier, Brenner's DOE enforcer who unquestioningly obeys orders, even if those orders have to do with killing those who have come into contact with Eleven. She is eventually killed by Eleven at the end of Season 1.
 Tobias Jelinek as the lead agent at Hawkins National Laboratory, who assists Brenner.
 Peyton Wich as Troy Walsh, a boy who antagonizes Mike, Lucas and Dustin. After being publicly humiliated by Eleven and an attempted retaliation on Mike, Troy is not seen again after Season 1. The comic book tie-in, "The Bully", reveals that he and his family moved away and that his bad behaviour was the result of his father, who encouraged him to be mean and remorseless. In the comic, Troy does seem to change for the better and feels remorseful for his actions for once, upon learning that his father was fired from his job for his poor attitude and refusal to apologize.
 Cade Jones as James Dante, a boy who hangs around with Troy. The comic book tie-in, "The Bully," does reveal that James grew tired of being bossed around and of Troy's behaviour. Eventually, before Troy and his family moved away, Troy finally apologized to James and waved farewell, which James returns. James is revealed to be currently residing in Hawkins.
 Chester Rushing as Tommy Hagan, a former best friend of Steve, and boyfriend of Carol. Tommy is a bully who revels in his popularity. He returns in Season 2 as a lackey for the new top dog in school, Billy Hargrove. Although unseen in Season 3, he is briefly mentioned by Steve.
 Chelsea Talmadge as Carol Perkins, a former best friend of Steve, and girlfriend of Tommy. Like her boyfriend, Carol will do anything to ensure her popularity.
 Aimee Mullins as Terry Ives, a woman whose daughter, Jane (Eleven), was stolen from her shortly after she gave birth. She has since gone into a mental state where she is unaware of her surroundings, as the men who stole Jane gave her electroshock therapy to try and cover up her existence.

Introduced in season two
 Linnea Berthelsen as Kali / 008, a young woman with illusion manipulation abilities, who, along with Eleven, was experimented on at the Hawkins Laboratory, but later managed to escape. She does have a caring side, though it is often covered by her vindictive personality. 
 Vanathi Kalai Parthiban as younger Kali in the Rainbow Room at Hawkins Laboratory in seasons 2 and 4.
 Catherine Curtin as Claudia Henderson, Dustin's sweet and caring yet often clueless mother. She is notably a single mother.
 Jennifer Marshall as Susan Hargrove, Max's mother, Billy's stepmother, and Neil's wife. Whereas her husband is abusive and selfish, she continues to be kind to Billy and seems to somewhat love her stepson.

Introduced in season three
 Jake Busey as Bruce Lowe, a journalist for the Hawkins Post who routinely harasses and mocks Nancy because of her sex. He becomes possessed by the Mind Flayer. Bruce is beaten to death by Nancy with a fire extinguisher after he attacks her, and his corpse merges with Tom's to become a gruesome arthropod-like monster.
 Andrey Ivchenko as Grigori, a Russian hitman and enforcer for the scientists working under Hawkins. He is killed by Hopper at the end of season 3.
 Michael Park as Tom Holloway, the editor of the Hawkins Post and Heather Holloway's father. He becomes possessed by the Mind Flayer. He is killed in self-defense by Jonathan, and his corpse merges with Bruce's to become a gruesome arthropod-like monster.
 Francesca Reale as Heather Holloway, a popular lifeguard at the Hawkins Community Pool who becomes possessed by the Mind Flayer
 Alec Utgoff as Dr. Alexei, a Russian scientist who was working with the regiment to open a portal to the Upside Down. He is later abducted by Hopper and Joyce Byers for information on his fellow Russians. Whilst with them, he develops an affinity for American products like cherry Slurpees, Burger King, Woody Woodpecker and Looney Tunes. He was developing a friendship with Murray before he was killed by Grigori at the fairgrounds.
 Cary Elwes as Mayor Larry Kline, a corrupt politician being blackmailed into working for the Russians.
 Peggy Miley as Doris Driscoll, an elderly resident of Hawkins who is visited by Jonathan and Nancy while investigating a story. She becomes possessed by the Mind Flayer.

Introduced in season four
 Mason Dye as Jason Carver, the captain of the Hawkins High School basketball team and Chrissy Cunningham's boyfriend. After Chrissy's death, he leads his team on a witch-hunt for Eddie, whom he believes to be the perpetrator and the leader of a Satanic cult. He confronts Lucas at the Creel House and Lucas manages to beat him in a fight. Jason is killed when Vecna opens the fourth gate which cuts through his body in half.
 Amybeth McNulty as Vickie, a student on the Hawkins High School marching band and Robin's love interest.
 Tristan Spohn as Two / 002, a lab subject at Hawkins Lab who bullies Eleven.
 Christian Ganiere as Ten / 010, Eleven’s predecessor.
 Myles Truitt as Patrick McKinney, a player on the basketball team. He is Vecna's third victim.
 Clayton Royal Johnson as Andy, a player on the basketball team.
 Tom Wlaschiha as Dmitri Antonov / "Enzo", a prison guard in Kamchatka that Hopper bribes to help secure his freedom. He is also imprisoned for treason with Hopper, but he and Hopper work together to escape with the help of Joyce and Murray.
 Vaidotas Martinaitis as Melnikov, the prison warden at Kamchatka.
 Nikola Đuričko as Yuri Ismaylov, a smuggler of American goods to Russia and Antonov's contact whom he instructs Joyce and Murray to meet with in Alaska. He betrays Antonov to the Russians and decides to hand Joyce and Murray over as prisoners in hopes of higher profits. However, Joyce and Murray hold him captive and use him to break into the prison to rescue Hopper. Antonov convinces Yuri to help them escape Russia.
 Sherman Augustus as Lt. Colonel Jack Sullivan, a U.S. Army official leading a manhunt for Eleven, believing her to be responsible for the latest string of murders in Hawkins.
 Joel Stoffer as Wayne Munson, Eddie’s uncle. Despite the town's beliefs about Eddie, Wayne cares deeply for his nephew and knows that he is innocent. In the aftermath of the opening of the fourth gate Wayne is comforted by Dustin who tells him that Eddie sacrificed himself to save Hawkins and that he was a hero.
 Pasha D. Lychnikoff as Oleg, an inmate at Kamchatka imprisoned alongside Hopper.
 Nikolai Nikolaeff as Ivan, a guard at Kamchatka.

Guest characters
The following is a supplementary list of guest stars that appear in lesser roles, make significant cameo appearances or who receive co-starring credit over multiple appearances. The characters are listed in the order in which they first appeared.

Introduced in season one
 Chris Sullivan as Benny Hammond, owner and chef of Benny's Burgers, and friend of Hopper. He takes care of Eleven shortly after her escape but is killed by Hawkins Lab personnel shortly afterwards.
 Tony Vaughn as Russell Coleman, the principal at Hawkins Middle School.
 Charles Lawlor as Donald Melvald, the owner of Melvald's General Store where Joyce Byers works.
 Hugh Holub as the lead scientist at Hawkins Laboratory.
 Andrew Benator as a scientist at Hawkins Laboratory.
 Pete Burris as the head of security at Hawkins Laboratory.
 Robert Walker-Branchaud as an agent of Hawkins Laboratory who disguises himself as a repairman.
 Glennellen Anderson as Nicole, a classmate of Nancy, Steve and Jonathan.
 Cynthia Barrett as Marsha Holland, Barbara's mother.
 Jerri Tubbs as Diane Hopper, Jim's ex-wife.
 Elle Graham as Sara Hopper, Jim and Diane's daughter, who died of cancer.
 Shawn Levy, the show's executive producer, makes a cameo appearance as a morgue worker.
 Amy Seimetz as Becky Ives, Terry's sister who takes care of her.

Introduced in season two
 Kai L. Green as Funshine, a member of Kali's crew. Kali considers him to be a teddy bear, despite his size and strength. He is the oldest of the crew.
 James Landry Hébert as Axel, an aggressive member of Kali's crew.
 Anna Jacoby-Heron as Dottie, the sarcastic newest member of Kali's crew.
 Gabrielle Maiden as Mick, a member of Kali's crew. She is the least aggressive of the crew and is their driver.
 Matty Cardarople as Keith, previously an employee at The Palace Arcade in 1984 but now works at Family Video nearly a year later.
 Madelyn Cline as Tina, a student in Hawkins High School and friend of Carol and Vicki.
 Abigail Cowen as Vicki, a student in Hawkins High School and friend of Carol and Tina.
 Karen Ceesay as Sue Sinclair, Lucas and Erica's mother.
 Arnell Powell as Charles Sinclair, Lucas and Erica's father.
 Aaron Muñoz as Mr. Holland, Barbara's father.
 Joe Davison as a technician at Hawkins Laboratory.
 Pruitt Taylor Vince as Ray, a technician at Hawkins Laboratory who electrocuted Terry Ives, contributing to her deteriorated mental state.
 Will Chase as Neil Hargrove, Billy's  biological father, Max's stepfather, and Susan's husband. He is very abusive to his son, both verbally and physically.

Introduced in season three
 John Vodka as General Stepanov, a KGB General
 Yasen Peyankov as a Russian Scientist who works along with Alexei. 
 Georgui Kasaev as a Russian comm officer
 Caroline Arapoglou as Winnie Kline, Mayor Larry Kline's wife.
 Allyssa Brooke as Candice, Mayor Larry Kline's secretary.
 Holly Morris as Janet Holloway, wife of Tom Holloway and mother of Heather Holloway
 Chantell D. Christopher as a receptionist at Hawkins Memorial Hospital.
 Misha Kuznetsov as Colonel Ozerov, an authoritative and brutal Soviet military officer.
 Arthur Darbinyan as Zharkov, a Russian scientist working for Commander Ozerov, who specializes in torturing hostages. 
 Beth Riesgraf as Billy Hargrove's mother.
 Gabriella Pizzolo as Suzie Bingham; Dustin's girlfriend, whom he met at summer camp. Suzie lives with her large Mormon family at a house in Salt Lake City.

Introduced in season four
 Grace Van Dien as Chrissy Cunningham, a Hawkins High School cheerleader who is killed by Vecna.
 Regina Ting Chen as Ms. Kelly, the counselor at Hawkins High School.
 Logan Riley Bruner as Fred Benson, Nancy's colleague at the Hawkins High School newspaper. He is haunted by his role in a fatal car accident. He is eventually killed by Vecna. 
 Elodie Grace Orkin as Angela, a popular student at Lenora High School in California who bullies Eleven. She is eventually taken to the hospital after Eleven strikes her in the face with a roller skate.
 Robert Englund as Victor Creel, a man arrested for supossedly murdering his wife and daughter in the 1950s and has since spent his life at a psychiatric institution. Creel maintains that his family was killed by a demon, and is left permanently disfigured after attempting to kill himself in prison by cutting out his eyes.
 Kevin L. Johnson as young Victor Creel
 Tyner Rushing as Virginia Creel, Victor Creel's wife who was telepathically killed along with her daughter by her son in the 1950s.
 Livi Burch as Alice Creel, the Creels' only daughter who was telepathically killed along with her mother by her brother in the 1950s. 
 Ira Amyx as Agent Harmon, a bodyguard working for Sam Owens. Harmon alongside his partner Agent Wallace, were assigned to protect Jonathan Byers, Will Byers, and Mike Wheeler from the military. Died defending children during the attack on the Byers' home.
 Kendrick Cross as Agent Wallace, a bodyguard working for Sam Owens. Wallace alongside his partner Agent Harmon, were assigned to protect Jonathan Byers, Will Byers, and Mike Wheeler from the military. Wounded and taken prisoner by Sullivan in order to find Eleven's whereabouts.
 Audrey Holcomb as Eden Bingham, Suzie's goth eldest sister who babysits her and the rest of their siblings. Argyle becomes infatuated with her upon first meeting her, and the two of them are later caught smoking marijuana together in Argyle's pizza van by Suzie, Mike, Will, and Jonathan.
 Ed Amatrudo as Director Hatch, the director of the psychiatric institution where Victor Creel was put after his arrest.
 Gwydion Lashlee-Walton as Gareth, is a member of the Hellfire Club at Hawkins High School and a member of Eddie Munson's band, Corroded Coffin. He plays the drums.
 Trey Best as Jeff, is a member of the Hellfire Club at Hawkins High School and a member of Eddie Munson's band, Corroded Coffin. He plays an electric guitar.
 Grant Goodman as Freak 1, is a member of the Hellfire Club and a member of Eddie Munson's band Corroded Coffin. He plays an electric bass.
 Paris Benjamin as Agent Stinson, an agent working for Sam Owens. She is the contact for Hopper to help him, Joyce, and Murray get back to the states.

References

External links
 Full cast and crew of Stranger Things at IMDb

Lists of drama television characters
Lists of horror television characters
Lists of science fiction television characters

 Stranger Things Characters- All major & New Casts